Enugu East is a Local Government Area of Enugu State, Nigeria. Enugu East is made up three  zones/districts: Nike-Uno, Ugwogo and Mbuli NjodoIts. Headquarters are in the town of Nkwo Nike.
 
It had an area of 383 km and a population of 279,089 at the 2006 census.

The postal code of the area is 400.

Government 
Enugu East Local Government Area is one of the lower tier administrations within Enugu state and it is under the Enugu west senatorial zone. This local government operates within the Enugu state government to provide development to the communities surrounding them.

Political Divisions 
Enugu East is one of the seventeen local government areas of Enugu State, and it is one of the three local governments that made up the Enugu Town urban area; alongside Enugu North and Enugu South  Local Governments. It comprises 3 district zones; Nike-Uno, Ugwogo and Mbuli NjodoIts in which other towns and villages reside under their authority.

References

Local Government Areas in Enugu State
Enugu
Local Government Areas in Igboland